The rock dove, rock pigeon, or common pigeon ( also ; Columba livia) is a member of the bird family Columbidae (doves and pigeons). In common usage, it is often simply referred to as the "pigeon".

The domestic pigeon (Columba livia domestica, which includes about 1,000 different breeds) descended from this species. Escaped domestic pigeons have increased the populations of feral pigeons around the world.

Wild rock doves are pale grey with two black bars on each wing, whereas domestic and feral pigeons vary in colour and pattern. Few differences are seen between males and females. The species is generally monogamous, with two squabs (young) per brood. Both parents care for the young for a time.

Habitats include various open and semi-open environments. Cliffs and rock ledges are used for roosting and breeding in the wild. Originally found wild in Europe, North Africa, and western Asia, pigeons have become established in cities around the world. The species is abundant, with an estimated population of 17 to 28 million feral and wild birds in Europe alone and up to 120 million worldwide.

Taxonomy and systematics 

The official common name is rock dove, as given by the International Ornithological Congress.
The rock dove was formally described in 1789 by the German naturalist Johann Friedrich Gmelin in his revised and expanded edition of Carl Linnaeus's Systema Naturae. He placed it with all the other doves and pigeons in the genus Columba and coined the binomial name Columba livia. The genus name Columba is the Latin word meaning "pigeon, dove", whose older etymology comes from the Ancient Greek κόλυμβος (kolumbos), "a diver", from κολυμβάω (kolumbao), "dive, plunge headlong, swim". Aristophanes (Birds, 304) and others use the word κολυμβίς (kolumbis), "diver", for the name of the bird, because of its swimming motion in the air. The specific epithet livia is a medieval Latin variant of livida, "livid, bluish-gray"; this was Theodorus Gaza's translation of Greek peleia, "dove", itself thought to be derived from pellos, "dark-colored". Its closest relative in the genus Columba is the hill pigeon, followed by the other rock pigeons: the snow, speckled, and white-collared pigeons. Pigeon chicks are called "squabs".
Note that members of the lesser known pigeon genus Petrophassa and the speckled pigeon (Columba guinea), also have the common name “rock pigeon”.
The rock dove was first described by German naturalist Johann Gmelin in 1789. The rock dove was central to Charles Darwin's discovery of evolution, and featured in four of his works from 1859 to 1872. Darwin posited that, despite wide-ranging morphological differences, the many hundreds of breeds of domestic pigeon could all be traced back to the wild rock dove; in essence human selection of pigeon breeds was analogous to natural selection.

Subspecies 
Twelve subspecies are recognised by Gibbs (2000); some of these may be derived from feral stock.
 The European rock dove (C. l. livia) – The nominate subspecies; Found in western and southern Europe, northern Africa, and Asia to western Kazakhstan, the northern Caucasus, Georgia, Cyprus, Turkey, Iran and Iraq.
The Indian rock dove (C. l. intermedia) (Strickland, 1844) – Found in Sri Lanka and in India south of the Himalayan range of C. l. neglecta. It is similar to that subspecies but darker, with a less contrasting back.
The Egyptian rock dove (C. l. schimperi) (Bonaparte, 1854) – Found in the Nile Delta south to northern Sudan, it closely resembles C. l. targia, but has a distinctly paler mantle.
The Senegal rock dove (C. l. gymnocyclus) (Gray, 1856) – Found from Senegal and Guinea to Ghana, Benin and Nigeria, it is smaller and very much darker than the nominate subspecies. It is almost blackish on the head, rump and underparts with a white back and the iridescence of the nape extending onto the head.
Hume's rock dove (C. l. neglecta) (Hume, 1873) – Found in the mountains of eastern Central Asia, it is similar to the nominate subspecies in size but darker, with a stronger and more extensive iridescent sheen on the neck. It intergrades with the next subspecies in the south.
The Iranian rock dove (C. l. gaddi) (Zarodney & Looudoni, 1906) – It breeds from Azerbaijan and Iran east to Uzbekistan. It is larger and paler than C. l. palaestinae, with which it intergrades in the west. It also intergrades with the next subspecies in the east.
 The Mongolian rock dove (C. l. nigricans) (Buturlin, 1908) – Found in Mongolia and northern China, it is a variable subspecies and is probably derived from feral pigeons.
The Arabian rock dove (C. l. palaestinae) (Zedlitz, 1912) – Ranging from Syria to Sinai and Arabia, it is slightly larger than C. l. schimperi and has darker plumage.
 The Canary Islands rock dove (C. l. canariensis) (Bannerman, 1914) – Found in the Canary Islands, it is smaller and usually darker than the nominate subspecies.
 The Saharan rock dove (C. l. targia) (Geyr von Schweppenburg, 1916) – It breeds in the mountains of the Sahara east to Sudan. It is slightly smaller than the nominate subspecies, with similar plumage, but the back is concolorous with the mantle instead of white.
 The oasis rock dove (C. l. dakhlae) (Richard Meinertzhagen, 1928) – Found only in two oases in central Egypt, it is smaller and much paler than the nominate subspecies.
The Cape Verde rock dove (C. l. atlantis) (Bannerman, 1931) – Found in Madeira, the Azores and Cape Verde, it is a very variable subspecies with chequered upperparts obscuring the black wingbars and is almost certainly derived from feral pigeons.

Description 

Centuries of domestication have greatly altered the rock dove. Feral pigeons, which have escaped domestication throughout history, have significant variations in plumage. When not specified, descriptions are for assumed wild type, though the wild type may be on the verge of extinction or already extinct.

It has a dark bluish-grey head, neck, and chest with glossy yellowish, greenish, and reddish-purple iridescence along its neck and wing feathers. The iris is orange, red, or golden with a paler inner ring, and the bare skin round the eye is bluish-grey. The bill is grey-black with a conspicuous off-white cere, and the feet are purplish-red.

The adult female is almost identical in outward appearance to the male, but the iridescence on her neck is less intense and more restricted to the rear and sides, whereas that on the breast is often very obscure.

The white lower back of the pure rock dove is its best identification characteristic; the two black bars on its pale grey wings are also distinctive. The tail has a black band on the end, and the outer web of the tail feathers are margined with white. It is strong and quick on the wing, dashing out from sea caves, flying low over the water, its lighter grey rump showing well from above.

Young birds show little lustre and are duller. Eye colour of the pigeon is generally orange, but a few pigeons may have white-grey eyes. The eyelids are orange and encapsulated in a grey-white eye ring. The feet are red to pink.

There have been numerous skeletal descriptions of the rock dove and the associated muscles including those of the eye, jaw, neck, and throat. The skull is dominated by the rostrum, eye socket, and braincase. The quadrate bone is relatively small and mobile and connects the rest of the cranium to the lower jaw. The latter has an angled shape in side view because the long-axis of the front half of the lower jaw is at a 30° angle to the back half. Beneath the skull, the hyoid skeleton involves three mid-line structures and a pair of elongate structures that stem from between the junction of the back two structures. The anterior structure (the paraglossum or entoglossum) is unpaired and shaped like an arrowhead. 

When circling overhead, the white underwing of the bird becomes conspicuous. In its flight, behaviour, and voice, which is more of a dovecot coo than the phrase of the wood pigeon, it is a typical pigeon. Although it is a relatively strong flier, it also glides frequently, holding its wings in a very pronounced V shape as it does. As prey birds, they must keep their vigilance, and when disturbed a pigeon within a flock will take off with a noisy clapping sound that cues for other pigeons to take to flight. The noise of the take-off increases the faster a pigeon beats its wings, thus advertising the magnitude of a perceived threat to its flockmates.

Feral pigeons are essentially the same size and shape as the original wild rock dove, but often display far greater variation in colour and pattern compared to their wild ancestors. The blue-barred pattern which the original wild rock dove displays is generally less common in more urban areas. Urban pigeons tend to have darker plumage than those in more rural areas.

Pigeons feathers have two types of melanin (pigment) – eumelanin and pheomelanin. A study of melanin in the feathers of both wild rock and domestic pigeons, of different coloration types and known genetic background, measured the concentration, distribution and proportions of eumelanin and pheomelanin and found that gene mutations affecting the distribution, amounts and proportions of pigments accounted for the greater variation of coloration in domesticated birds than in their wild relations. Eumelanin generally causes grey or black colouration, while pheomelanin results in a reddish-brown colour. Other shades of brown may be produced through different combinations and concentrations of the two colours. As in other animals, white pigeons have little to no pigment. Darker birds may be better able to store trace metals in their feathers due to their higher concentrations of melanin, which may help mitigate the negative effects of the metals, the concentrations of which are typically higher in urban areas. Pigeons, especially homing or carrier breeds, are well known for their ability to find their way home from long distances. Despite these demonstrated abilities, wild rock doves are sedentary and rarely leave their local areas. It is hypothesized that in their natural, arid habitat, they rely on this sense to navigate back home after foraging as deserts rarely possess navigational landmarks that may be used.

A rock pigeon's lifespan ranges from 3–5 years in the wild to 15 years in captivity, though longer-lived specimens have been reported. The main causes of mortality in the wild are predators and persecution by humans. Some sources state the species was first introduced to North America in 1606 at Port Royal, Nova Scotia. Although other sources cite Plymouth and Jamestown settlements in the early 17th century as the first place for species introduction in North America.

Vocalizations 
The call is a soft, slightly wavering, coo. Ornithologist David Sibley describes the display call as a whoo, hoo-witoo-hoo, whereas the Cornell Lab of Ornithology describes it as a Coo, roo-c'too-coo. Variations include an alarm call, a nest call, and noises made by juveniles. Sibley describes the nest call as a repeated hu-hu-hurrr. When displaying, songs are partly sexual, partly threatening. They are accompanied by an inflated throat, tail fanning, strutting, and bowing. The alarm call, given at sight of predators, is a grunt-like oorhh.

Non-vocal sounds include a loud flapping noise at take-off, feet stomping, hisses, and beak snapping. Wings may also be clapped during flights, usually during display fights or after copulation. Juveniles particularly snap their bills, usually to respond to nest invasion. The foot stomping appears deliberate, though for what purpose is unclear. Foot stomping is done with a certain foot first, showing that rock doves have "footedness", similar to human handedness.

Osmoregulation

Distribution and habitat 

Before the Columbian Exchange, rock doves were restricted to a natural resident range in western and southern Europe, North Africa, and extending into South Asia. They were carried into the New World aboard European ships between 1603 and 1607. It has a large global population, including an estimated 17 to 28 million individuals in Europe. Fossil evidence suggests the rock dove originated in southern Asia, and skeletal remains, unearthed in Israel, confirm its existence there for at least 300,000 years. However, this species has such a long history with humans that it is impossible to identify its original range exactly.

Wild pigeons reside in rock formations and cliff faces, settling in crevices to nest. They nest communally, often forming large colonies of many hundreds of individuals. Wild nesting sites include caves, canyons, and sea cliffs. They will even live in the Sahara so long as an area has rocks, water, and some plant matter. They prefer to avoid dense vegetation.

Rock doves have a commensal relationship with humans, gaining both ample access to food and nesting spots in civilized areas. Human structures provide an excellent imitation of cliff structures, making rock doves very common around human habitation. Skyscrapers, highway overpasses, farm buildings, abandoned buildings, and other human structures with ample crevices are conducive to rock dove nesting. Thus the modern range of the rock dove is due in large part to humans. Agricultural settlements are favored over forested ones. Ideal human nesting attributes combine areas with tall buildings, green spaces, ample access to human food, and schools. Conversely, suburban areas which are far from city centers and have high street density are the least conducive to pigeons. Their versatility among human structures is evidenced by a population living inside a deep well in Tunisia.

Feral pigeons are usually unable to find these accommodations, so they must nest on building ledges, walls or statues. They may damage these structures via their feces; starving birds can only excrete urates, which over time corrodes masonry and metal. In contrast, a well-fed bird passes mostly solid feces, containing only small amounts of uric acid.

Behavior and ecology 
Pigeons are often found in pairs in the breeding season, but are usually gregarious.

Breeding 

The rock dove breeds at any time of the year, but peak times are spring and summer. Nesting sites are along coastal cliff faces, as well as the artificial cliff faces created by apartment buildings with accessible ledges or roof spaces. Pigeons can compete with native birds for nest sites. For some avian species, such as seabirds, it could be a conservation issue. Current evidence suggests that wild, domestic and feral pigeons mate for life, although their long-term bonds are not unbreakable. They are socially monogamous, but extra-pair matings do occur, often initiated by males. Due to their ability to produce crop milk, pigeons can breed at any time of year. Pigeons breed when the food supply is abundant enough to support embryonic egg development, which in cities, can be any time of the year. Laying of eggs can take place up to six times per year.

Pigeons are often found in pairs during the breeding season, but usually the pigeons are gregarious, living in flocks of 50 to 500 birds (dependent on the food supply).

Courtship rituals can be observed in urban parks at any time of the year. The male on the ground or rooftops puffs up the feathers on his neck to appear larger and thereby impress or attract attention. He approaches the female at a rapid walking pace while emitting repetitive quiet notes, often bowing and turning as he comes closer. At first, the female invariably walks or flies a short distance away and the male follows her until she stops. At this point, he continues the bowing motion and very often makes full- or half-pirouettes in front of the female. The male then proceeds to feed the female by regurgitating food, as they do when feeding the young. The male then mounts the female, rearing backwards to be able to join their cloacae. The mating is very brief, with the male flapping his wings to maintain balance on top of the female.

The nest is a flimsy platform of straw and sticks, laid on a ledge, under cover, often on the window ledges of buildings. Two white eggs are laid; incubation, shared by both parents, lasts 17 to 19 days. The newly hatched squab (nestling) has pale yellow down and a flesh-coloured bill with a dark band. For the first few days, the baby squabs are tended and fed (through regurgitation) exclusively on "crop milk" (also called "pigeon milk" or "pigeon's milk"). The pigeon milk is produced in the crops of both parents in all species of pigeon and dove. The fledging period is about 30 days.

Feeding 

Rock doves are omnivorous, but prefer plant matter: chiefly fruits and grains.

Studies of pigeons in a semi-rural part of Kansas found that their diet includes the following: 92% maize, 3.2% oats, 3.7% cherry, along with small amounts of knotweed, elm, poison ivy and barley. Feral pigeons can be seen eating grass seeds and berries in parks and gardens in the spring, but plentiful sources exist throughout the year from scavenging (e.g., food remnants left inside of dropped fast food cartons, in the form of popcorn, cake, peanuts, bread and currants) and they also eat insects and spiders. Additional food is also usually available from waste bins, tourists or residents who feed bird seed to pigeons for reasons such as empathy, fun, tradition and as a means for social interaction. Pigeons tend to congregate in large, often thick flocks when feeding on discarded food, and may be observed flying skillfully around trees, buildings, telephone poles and cables and even through moving traffic just to reach a food source.

Pigeons feed on the ground in flocks or individually. Pigeons are naturally granivorous, eating seeds that fit down their gullet. They may sometimes consume small invertebrates such as worms or insect larvae as a protein supplement. As they do not possess an enlarged cecum as in European wood pigeons, they cannot digest adult plant tissue; the various seeds they eat containing the appropriate nutrients they require. While most birds take small sips and tilt their heads backwards when drinking, pigeons are able to dip their bills into the water and drink continuously, without having to tilt their heads back. In cities they typically resort to scavenging human garbage, as unprocessed grain may be impossible to find. Pigeon groups typically consist of producers, which locate and obtain food, and scroungers, which feed on food obtained by the producers. Generally, groups of pigeons contain a greater proportion of scroungers than producers.

Preening 
Pigeons primarily use powder down feathers for preening, which gives a soft and silky feel to their plumage. They have no preen gland or at times have very rudimentary preen glands, so oil is not used for preening. Rather, powder down feathers are spread across the body. These have a tendency to disintegrate, and the powder, akin to talcum powder, helps maintain the plumage. Some varieties of domestic pigeon have modified feathers called "fat quills". These feathers contain yellow, oil-like fat that derives from the same cells as powder down. This is used while preening and helps reduce bacterial degradation of feathers by feather bacilli.

Survival

Predators 
With only their flying abilities protecting them from predation, rock pigeons are a favourite almost around the world for a wide range of raptors. In fact, with feral pigeons existing in almost every city in the world, they may form the majority of prey for several raptor species that live in urban areas. Peregrine falcons and Eurasian sparrowhawks are natural predators of pigeons and quite adept at catching and feeding upon this species. Up to 80% of the diet of peregrine falcons in several cities that have breeding falcons is composed of feral pigeons. Some common predators of feral pigeons in North America are opossums, raccoons, red-tailed hawks, great horned owls, eastern screech owls, and accipiters. The birds that prey on pigeons in North America can range in size from American kestrels to golden eagles and may even include gulls, crows and ravens. On the ground the adults, their young and their eggs are at risk from feral and domestic cats. Doves and pigeons are considered to be game birds, since many species are hunted and used for food in many of the countries in which they are native.

The body feathers have dense, fluffy bases and are loosely attached to the skin, hence they drop out easily. When a predator catches a pigeon large numbers of feathers come out in the attacker's mouth and the pigeon may use this temporary distraction to make an escape. It also tends to drop the tail feathers when preyed upon or under traumatic conditions, probably as a distraction mechanism.

Parasites 

Pigeons may harbour a diverse parasite fauna.
They often host the intestinal helminths Capillaria columbae and Ascaridia columbae. Their ectoparasites include the ischnoceran lice Columbicola columbae, Campanulotes bidentatus compar, the amblyceran lice Bonomiella columbae, Hohorstiella lata, Colpocephalum turbinatum, the mites Tinaminyssus melloi, Dermanyssus gallinae, Dermoglyphus columbae, Falculifer rostratus and Diplaegidia columbae. The hippoboscid fly Pseudolynchia canariensis is a typical blood-sucking ectoparasite of pigeons in tropical and subtropical regions.

Relationship to humans

Domestication 

Rock doves have been domesticated for several thousand years, giving rise to the domestic pigeon (Columba livia domestica). They may have been domesticated as long as 5,000 years ago. Numerous breeds of fancy pigeons of all sizes, colours, and types have been bred. Domesticated pigeons are used as homing pigeons as well as food and pets. They were in the past also used as carrier pigeons.

War pigeons 

So-called war pigeons have played significant roles during wartime, and many pigeons have received awards and medals for their services in saving hundreds of human lives.

Medical uses
Pigeons have notably been "employed" as medical imaging data sorters. They have been successfully trained under research conditions to examine data on a screen for the purposes of detecting breast cancer. They appear to use their innate visual navigation skills to do so.

Feral pigeon 

Many domestic birds have got lost, escaped or been released over the years and have given rise to feral pigeons. These show a variety of plumages, although many have the blue-barred pattern as does the pure rock dove. Feral pigeons are found in cities and towns all over the world. The scarcity of the pure wild species is partly due to interbreeding with feral birds.

Human health 
Contact with pigeon droppings poses a minor risk of contracting histoplasmosis, cryptococcosis and psittacosis, and long-term exposure to both droppings and feathers can induce an allergy known as bird fancier's lung.
Pigeons are not a major concern in the spread of West Nile virus: though they can contract it, they apparently do not transmit it.

Some contagions are transmitted by pigeons; for example, the bacteria Chlamydophila psittaci is endemic among pigeons and causes psittacosis in humans. It is generally transmitted from handling pigeons or their droppings (more commonly the latter). Psittacosis is a serious disease but rarely fatal (less than 1%). Pigeons are also important vectors for various species of the bacteria Salmonella, which causes diseases such as salmonellosis and paratyphoid fever.

Pigeons are also known to host avian mites, which can infest human habitation and bite humans, a condition known as gamasoidosis. However, infesting mammals is relatively rare.

Avian influenza 
Pigeons may, however, carry and spread avian influenza. One study has shown that adult pigeons are not clinically susceptible to the most dangerous strain of avian influenza, H5N1, and that they do not transmit the virus to poultry. Other studies have presented evidence of clinical signs and neurological lesions resulting from infection but found that the pigeons did not transmit the disease to poultry reared in direct contact with them. Pigeons were found to be "resistant or minimally susceptible" to other strains of avian influenza, such as the H7N7.

Research into whether pigeons play a part in spreading bird flu have shown pigeons do not carry the deadly H5N1 strain. Three studies have been done since the late 1990s by the US Agriculture Department's Southeast Poultry Research Laboratory in Athens, Georgia, according to the center's director, David Swayne. The lab has been working on bird flu since the 1970s. In one experiment, researchers squirted into pigeons' mouths liquid drops that contained the highly pathogenic H5N1 virus from a Hong Kong sample. The birds received 100 to 1,000 times the concentration that wild birds would encounter in nature. "We couldn't infect the pigeons," Swayne said. "So that's good news."

Stages of lifecycle

References

External links 

 
 
 Rock dove - Species text in The Atlas of Southern African Birds.
California Wildlife Center cautions about backyard invaders
Power Requirements for Horizontal Flight in the Pigeon Columba livia -C. J. PENNYCUICK

rock dove
Domesticated birds
Cosmopolitan birds
Birds of Eurasia
Birds of North Africa
rock dove
Articles containing video clips
rock dove